Aliabad (also Romanized as ‘Alīābād; also known as ‘Alīābād-e Sāzemān) is a village in Halil Rural District, in the Central District of Jiroft County, Kerman Province, Iran. At the 2006 census, its population was 54, in 12 families.

References 

Populated places in Jiroft County